Davy Lake is a lake in Saskatchewan, Canada.

Origin of Name
Davy Lake was named as part of the Saskatchewan government's geo-memorial program of the 1950s and 1960s.  Warrant Officer 1 Henry William (Bill) Davy Jr. DFC of Prince Albert Saskatchewan was the son of Henry William and Louisa Agnes (Vickers) Davy and flew with No. 156 Squadron RAF as a navigator during the Second World War.  His Avro Lancaster III JB230 was shot down 24-Jun-1944 just east of Lille during a night raid on the flying bomb works at Coubronnes.  His grave is located at Zuytpeene churchyard near Cassel, Nord, France.

See also
List of lakes in Saskatchewan

References
Google Maps
Saskatchewan Virtual War Memorial Casualty Details for Henry William Davy
156 Squadron ORB Slide

Lakes of Saskatchewan